Saba Khalid is a Pakistani social entrepreneur, activist, public speaker, and journalist. She is the founder of the digital content platform, Aurat Raaj.

Career 
Khalid worked in the corporate sector for ten years as a communication consultant before turning to writing full time.

Khalid is the founder of Aurat Raaj, a women empowerment, education, and entertainment platform that uses digital technologies. Founded in December 2016, Aurat Raaj’s key product ‘Raaji’ is a AI chatbot that educates girls on taboo health, safety and hygiene topics such as menstruation, pregnancy, and STDs.

Khalid has completed fellowships including IFA Cross Culture, International Visitor Leadership program, Tech Camp and the Do School fellowship.

Khalid is the finalist of UNICEF Menstrual Hygiene Challenge in 2017 where she developed a cartoon on menstrual hygiene in Urdu and distributed it to rural areas. She pioneered The DO School's entrepreneurial hub DoX in Karachi.

In 2018, she was a finalist of the She Loves Tech Global Startup Competition.

Awards and accolades 

 The start-up's AI-infused bot, Raaji is the recipient of the Vodafone Innovation for Women prize and UKAID ILM Ideas prize.
 2018: Won the AI Empowering the Future Award at BAFTA in UK.
 March 2019: Won the Learning and Education category at the UN World Summit Awards held in Lisbon, Portugal.

Social representation 
Khalid is a keynote speaker and her talks on representation of women in the tech space have been featured in Tech BBQ 2019 and the World Summit of Arts and Culture in 2019.

References

External links 

 Profile
 Auraat Raj official website

Living people
1989 births
Pakistani women
Pakistani women activists
Pakistani activists